Canadian Nuclear Laboratories (CNL) research facilities are located in Chalk River, Ontario, Canada, approximately 180km north-west of Ottawa. There are three new additions to the site. The Logistics Warehouse (5016 sqm / 54000 sqft) contains a large reception space, offices, and storage. The Support and Maintenance Facility (4800 sqm / 51670 sqft) houses equipment, offices, and flexible open spaces. The Science Collaboration Centre (8198 sqm / 88240 sqft) has studios, laboratories, and administrative spaces. 

CNL is a nuclear technology and research institute. Their ageing facilities required an overhaul to continue innovation. The campus contains over 300 buildings across a 3700 hectare plot of land along the Ottawa River. Design firm HDR was the architect.

History 
Historically, the Chalk River Laboratories was a nuclear power plant and advanced nuclear research facility. CNL began developing nuclear technology in the late 1940's and early 1950's. The government owned company Atomic energy of Canada Limited (AECL) took over Chalk River Nuclear Laboratories in 1952, but today the site remains operated through contractors such as CNL. This is referred to as GoCo management, government owned and contractor operated. The research led to the development of the CANDU reactor. Other research included fuels, hydrogen production, storage and handling of radiation, and more recently alpha therapies medical isotope treatment for cancer. In 2014, Ontario became the first jurisdiction in North America to leave behind coal fired power plants and fully rely on nuclear power and renewable energies. In 2016 a $1.2 billion dollar investment plan over ten years was released by the Government of Canada. The investment plan required the decommissioning of 120 aged facilities and designing new centres.

Design 
The Logistics Warehouse is the new public face to the campus. It finished construction in September 2020 at $30.6 million dollars. This is a two storey building that houses spaces for reception and information, offices, and storage. The front half of the building is the public space, with storage in the back half. The front facade design is mostly transparent using glazing with wood slatting in front of the curtain walls. 

The Support and Maintenance Facility is also a two storey building. This is their manufacturing and servicing depot. This facility was completed in March 2021 at $32.8 million dollars. The interior of the warehouse has entirely exposed services and structure. The facade on this building is mostly solid, with thin glazing that frames the surrounding forest. 

The Science Collaboration Centre is a six storey, multi-use building that will act as the heart of the campus. Its projected completion date is Spring 2023 with a budget of $62 million dollars. The building will feature three open plan studios, offices, laboratories, and data storage. The facade design is mostly glass which will reveal the active spaces inside as well as the wood structure.

References 



Research institutes in Canada
Buildings and structures in Renfrew County
Sustainable architecture
Wooden buildings and structures